There are several rivers in Brazil named Itaim River:

 Itaim River (Minas Gerais)
 Itaim River (Piauí)
 Itaim River (São Paulo)